The 2022 Texas Southern Tigers football team represented Texas Southern University as a member of the Southwestern Athletic Conference (SWAC) during the 2022 NCAA Division I FCS football season. They were led by head coach Clarence McKinney, who was coaching his fourth season with the program. The Tigers played their home games at PNC Stadium in Houston.

Schedule
Texas Southern finalized their 2022 schedule on February 26, 2022.

References

Texas Southern Tigers
Texas Southern Tigers football seasons
Texas Southern Tigers